Bresilioidea is a superfamily of shrimp. It is likely to be an artificial group, containing five families which may or may not be related.

References

Caridea
Arthropod superfamilies